Gómez Farías is the municipal seat of Gómez Farías Municipality, Tamaulipas.

As of 2010 Gómez Farías was the 2nd most populous locality in Gómez Farías Municipality, having 883 inhabitants.

References

Populated places in Tamaulipas